Handel Bentley (14 November 1871 – 1945) was an English footballer who played in the Football League for Bolton Wanderers.

References

1871 births
1945 deaths
English footballers
Association football forwards
English Football League players
Bolton Wanderers F.C. players
FA Cup Final players